Robert Vincent Hassmiller (December 17, 1916 – September 8, 1980) was a college basketball All-American at Fordham University (1936–1939) and professional basketball player in the National Basketball League (1939–1942). As a senior in 1938–39, Hassmiller was the team captain and guided the Rams to a 10–8 overall record.

References

1916 births
1980 deaths
Akron Firestone Non-Skids players
All-American college men's basketball players
American men's basketball players
Basketball players from New Jersey
Fordham Rams men's basketball players
Sportspeople from Bayonne, New Jersey
Toledo Jim White Chevrolets players
Guards (basketball)